Oudendijk is a hamlet in the Dutch province of South Holland and is part of the municipality of Hoeksche Waard. Oudendijk lies 3 km south east from Westmaas.

Oudendijk is not a statistical entity, and considered part of Strijen. It has no place name signs, and consists of about 50 houses.

References

Populated places in South Holland
Hoeksche Waard